Carl Rubin may refer to:

Carl Rubin (architect) (1899–1955), Israeli architect
Carl Bernard Rubin (1920–1995), American federal judge